Jealousy, also known as Varieté, is a 1925 German silent comedy drama film directed by Karl Grune and starring Lya De Putti, Werner Krauss and Georg Alexander.

Cast
 Lya De Putti as Frau (Marthe Ménard)
 Werner Krauss as Mann (Georges Ménard)
 Georg Alexander as Freund (Pierre de Ronceray)
 Angelo Ferrari
 Mary Kid

References

External links

1925 films
1925 comedy-drama films
Films of the Weimar Republic
German silent feature films
German comedy-drama films
Films directed by Karl Grune
German black-and-white films
Films produced by Erich Pommer
Films with screenplays by Paul Czinner
UFA GmbH films
Silent comedy films
1920s German films
1920s German-language films